Nail'd is an off-road arcade racing game developed by Techland for Microsoft Windows, PlayStation 3 and Xbox 360. Nail'd was released on 30 November 2010 in North America and later on in 2011 in the PAL region and Japan. The game focuses on ATV and dirtbike racing, with an emphasis on speed and verticality.

Nail'd is published by Deep Silver and Cyberfront and features a soundtrack including bands such as Rise Against, Slipknot and Queens of the Stone Age.

Reception

Nail'd received "mixed or average" reviews on all platforms according to the review aggregation website Metacritic.  In Japan, Famitsu gave the PlayStation 3 and Xbox 360 versions a score of 30 out of 40, while Famitsu X360 gave it a similar score of one seven, one eight, one seven, and one eight.

References

External links
 Official website
 Deep Silver Website: Nail'd page
 

2010 video games
CyberFront games
Deep Silver games
Multiplayer and single-player video games
Off-road racing video games
PlayStation 3 games
Techland games
Video games developed in Poland
Video games featuring protagonists of selectable gender
Windows games
Xbox 360 games